{{DISPLAYTITLE:C20H23N}}
The molecular formula C20H23N (molar mass: 277.40 g/mol, exact mass: 277.1830 u) may refer to:

 Amitriptyline
 2-Ethylidene-1,5-dimethyl-3,3-diphenylpyrrolidine (EDDP)
 Litracen
 Maprotiline

Molecular formulas